Apollon Kalamata is a football (soccer) club in Kalamata, Greece.  It currently plays in the Messenia(n) First Division.

History

The club was founded in 1927.  Its colors are white and black and its emblem is a plant.  During the prewar period, the players was raised mainly in the royalist part of the population.  Along with Prassina Poulia made its important football (soccer) teams in Kalamata.  Apollon had distinctly many players.

After the war, it took part many times in the prefectural championships and took part in their first championship in the Second Division in 1959 and 1960.  In 1967, the dictatorship dissolved temporarily the team and united with two other clubs of the city: Prasina Poulia and Olympiakos to create Kalamata FC.

Apollon was refounded in 1974 and returned to its original position.  It began from the last part of the prefectural soccer.  It quickly elevated to the categories and in the 1975-76 season, it returned to the national category.  It did not enter the Second Division.

From then, it took part in many local titles and had won many times in the National Artistic Championships of the Fourth Division.  It plays in the prefectural first division.

From Apollon, Panagiotis Bahramis started is career and participated in the national youth team and later in First Division teams.

Other than the soccer club, in 1948, it mention the founding of the swimming club along with Prassina Poulia, AEK Kalamata and Kalamata NC founded on July 17, 1948, in Kalamata and its swimming teams "First Akropoleia" with the sponsor of the newspaper "Akropolis".

Achievements
National Artistic Championships (1) (1975)
Messenian Championship (1):
1959, 1975
Messinia Cup (2):
1992, 1999

Players
As of the 2008–09 season:

Konstantinopoulos
Koukeas
Latiniotis
Malamas
Mitseas
Palamaros
Papageorgiou
Seferas/Seferassi?
Stathas
Theiakos
Trikourakis
Vretteas

Association football clubs established in 1928
Sport in Kalamata
Football clubs in Peloponnese (region)
1928 establishments in Greece